Machine Man is a novel written by Max Barry. Published in 2011, it is Barry's fourth novel, following 2006's Company. It was initially an online serial, before being updated and published in 2011 by Vintage Books. The film rights have been picked up by Mandalay Pictures.

Characters
 Dr. Charles Neumann – mechanical engineer
 Dr. Angelica Austin – Charles Neumann's medical doctor
 Lola Shanks – Physical Therapist and Charles Neumann's love interest
 Cassandra Cautery – A middle manager, Better Future
 Carl LaRussos – Security Guard, Better Future
 The Manager – Better Future's CEO

Synopsis

Charles Neumann is a mechanical engineer working at Better Future, a military research company. After losing one of his legs in a hydraulic clamp, he begins to tinker with leg prosthetics. The replacements he builds are so advanced that he amputates his remaining leg in order to make full use of them. Better Futures provides him with his own research division in cybernetics, first aimed at selling medical prosthetics, then at augmentations for private customers and finally at creating augmented soldiers. This eventually leads him to accidentally cut off his hand. Meanwhile, his assistants invent all new things involving the body. He falls in love with Lola, and befriends his body guard Carl.

Over the course of events, Neumann gradually replaces more body parts with machinery, suffering various psychological side effects in the process. After first being rebuilt from the neck down as a machine soldier, his mind is eventually uploaded into a computer.

References

2011 Australian novels
Novels by Max Barry
Australian science fiction novels
Novels first published in serial form
Novels first published online
Australian thriller novels
Cyborgs in literature
Vintage Books books